Sharon Township, Ohio may refer to:

Sharon Township, Franklin County, Ohio
Sharon Township, Medina County, Ohio
Sharon Township, Noble County, Ohio
Sharon Township, Richland County, Ohio

See also
Sharon Township (disambiguation)

Ohio township disambiguation pages